Renaissance Tower may refer to:

 Renaissance Tower (Dallas)
 Renaissance Tower (Detroit)
 Renaissance Tower (Sacramento)
 Renaissance Tower (Tokyo)

See also
 Renaissance Center